Muhammad Hasan Mahmud (born 5 June 1963) is a Bangladesh Awami League politician who is the incumbent Member of Parliament from Chittagong-7 constituency. In January 2019, he  appointed as the Bangladesh Minister of Information. He is also a Joint Secretary of the Bangladesh Awami League.

Early life
Muhammad Hasan Mahmud was born on 5 June 1963 in Chittagong. He completed his bachelor's and master's in chemistry from the University of Chittagong in 1987 and 1989 respectively. He completed a second masters from Vrije Universiteit Brussel in environmental science in 1996. He earned his PhD in environmental chemistry from Transnational University Limburg in 2001.

Career 
In 1977, Mahmud joined Bangladesh Chhatra League.

During 1996–2001, Mahmud served as the political and parliamentary affairs adviser to then prime minister Sheikh Hasina. In 2001, he was appointed special assistant to then opposition leader of parliament, Sheikh Hasina. He was appointed the Secretary of Environment and Forest affair of Awami League.

Mahmud was the Jatiya Sangsad member from Chittagong-6 constituency during 2008–2014. He had received 101,340 votes while his nearest rival of Bangladesh Nationalist Party, Salahuddin Quader Chowdhury, received 72,073 votes.

Mahmud was appointed as the state minister for foreign affairs in January 2009 in Sheikh Hasina's cabinet but 6 months later he was moved to the position of state minister for environment and forests. In November 2011, he was promoted to the full minister of environment and forest and served the position until the end of 2013.

Mahmud was elected to parliament from Chittagong-7  in 2014 as a candidate of Awami League in an uncontested election. In the election 50 percent of the seats were won without a vote as the main opposition party, Bangladesh Nationalist Party, led alliance boycotted the election.

Mahmud was re-elected to parliament from Chittagong-7  in 2018 as a candidate of Awami League. He had received 217,155 votes while his nearest rival from Liberal Democratic Party, Md Nurul Alam, received 6,065 votes.

In September 2022, Mahmud was nominated to the Awami League Local Government Public Representative Nomination Board. Secretary Md Mokbul Hossain at the Information Ministry under Mahmud was sent to forced retirement in October.

Personal life
Mahmud is married to Nuran Fatema Hasan.

References 

1963 births
Living people
People from Chittagong District
University of Chittagong alumni
Maastricht University alumni
Awami League politicians
9th Jatiya Sangsad members
10th Jatiya Sangsad members
State Ministers of Foreign Affairs (Bangladesh)
State Ministers of Environment and Forests (Bangladesh)
Environment, Forest and Climate Change ministers of Bangladesh
11th Jatiya Sangsad members
Information ministers of Bangladesh